Sir Martin Hairer  (born 14 November 1975) is an Austrian-British mathematician working in the field of stochastic analysis, in particular stochastic partial differential equations. He is Professor of Mathematics at EPFL (École Polytechnique Fédérale de Lausanne) and at Imperial College London. He previously held appointments at the  University of Warwick and the Courant Institute of New York University. In 2014 he was awarded the Fields Medal, one of the highest honours a mathematician can achieve. In 2020 he won the 2021 Breakthrough Prize in Mathematics.

Early life and education
Hairer was born in Geneva, Switzerland. He attended the Collège Claparède Geneva where he received his high school diploma in 1994. He entered a school science competition with sound editing software that was developed into Amadeus,
and later continued to maintain the software in addition to his academic work; it continued to be widely used . He then attended the University of Geneva, where he obtained his Bachelor of Science degree in Mathematics in July 1998, Master of Science in Physics in October 1998 and PhD in Physics under the supervision of Jean-Pierre Eckmann in November 2001.

Research and career
Hairer is active in the field of stochastic partial differential equations in particular, and in stochastic analysis and stochastic dynamics in general.  He has worked on variants of Hörmander's theorem, systematisation of the construction of Lyapunov functions for stochastic systems, development of a general theory of ergodicity for non-Markovian systems, multiscale analysis techniques, theory of homogenisation, theory of path sampling and theory of rough paths and, in 2014, on his theory of regularity structures.

Under the name HairerSoft, he develops Macintosh software.

Affiliations

Regius Professor of Mathematics, University of Warwick (2014–2017)
Member of the scientific steering committee of ETHZ-ITS (2013–2019)
Institut Henri Poincaré, member of scientific steering committee (2012–2020)
Mathematical Research Institute of Oberwolfach, member of steering committee (2013–2021)
Editor, Probability Theory and Related Fields
Editor, Nonlinear Differential Equations and Applications
Editor, Annales Henri Poincaré Ser. B
Editor, Electronic Journal of Probability
Editor, Stochastic Partial Differential Equations: Analysis and Computations
Visiting Professor, Université Paul Sabatier, Toulouse (December 2006 and February 2014)
Visiting Professor, Technical University of Berlin (July 2009)
Visiting Professor, École Normale Supérieure, Paris (April 2013)
Member, Institute for Advanced Study, Princeton (March – April 2014)
Lipschitz Lectures, Hausdorff Center for Mathematics, University of Bonn (July 2013)
Minerva Lectures, Columbia University (February 2014)
Euler Lecture, Zuse Institute Berlin (May 2014)
Medallion Lecture, Institute of Mathematical Statistics (July 2014)
Lévy Lecture, Conference on Stochastic Processes and their Applications (July 2014)
Fields Medal lecture, International Congress of Mathematicians, Seoul (August 2014)
Collingwood Lecture, Durham University (February 2015)
Bernoulli Lecture, École polytechnique fédérale de Lausanne (May 2015) 
Leonardo da Vinci Lecture, University of Milan (October 2015) 
Kai-Lai Chung Lecture, Stanford University (November 2015)
Michalik Lecture, University of Pittsburgh (December 2015)

Awards and honours
 2006–2011 Advanced Research Fellowship, Engineering and Physical Sciences Research Council (EPSRC)
 2007 – Editors' Choice Award, Macworld
 2008 – Whitehead Prize, London Mathematical Society
 2008 – Philip Leverhulme Prize, Leverhulme Trust
 2009 – Royal Society Wolfson Research Merit Award
 2012 – Leverhulme Research Leadership Award, Leverhulme Trust
 2013 – Fermat Prize, Institut de Mathématiques de Toulouse
 2014 – Consolidator grant, European Research Council
 2014 – Elected Fellow of the Royal Society (FRS) in 2014
 2014 – Fröhlich Prize, London Mathematical Society
 2014 – Fields Medal
 2015 – Fellow of the American Mathematical Society
 2015 – Member of the Austrian Academy of Sciences
 2015 – Member of the Academy of Sciences Leopoldina
 2015 – Member of the Academia Europaea
 2016 – Honorary Knight Commander of the Order of the British Empire
 2017 – Foreign member of the Polish Academy of Sciences
 2019 – Substantive Knight Commander of the Order of the British Empire
 2021 – Breakthrough Prize in Mathematics
 2022 – King Faisal Prize

Personal life

Hairer holds Austrian and British nationality, and speaks French, German and English; he married fellow mathematician Li Xue-Mei in 2003. His father is Ernst Hairer, a mathematician at the University of Geneva.

References

1975 births
Living people
20th-century British mathematicians
21st-century British mathematicians
Academics of the University of Warwick
Austrian emigrants to England
Austrian expatriates in Switzerland
Courant Institute of Mathematical Sciences faculty
Fellows of the American Mathematical Society
Fellows of the Royal Society
Fields Medalists
Institute for Advanced Study visiting scholars
Knights Commander of the Order of the British Empire
Members of the Austrian Academy of Sciences
Probability theorists
Royal Society Wolfson Research Merit Award holders
University of Geneva alumni
Whitehead Prize winners
Members of the German Academy of Sciences Leopoldina
Naturalised citizens of the United Kingdom